Jang Jun-young (born 4 February 1993) is a South Korean footballer who plays as defender for Suwon FC.

Career
Jang joined K League Challenge side Daejeon Citizen in January 2016.

References

External links 

1993 births
Living people
Association football defenders
South Korean footballers
Daejeon Hana Citizen FC players
Seongnam FC players
Suwon FC players
Korea National League players
K League 2 players